VMB2 is a UHF Citizens' Band Radio (UHF CB) Repeater located on the Central Coast, New South Wales, Australia. It provides coverage from Newcastle in the north to Sydney's North Shore in the south and as far west as the Watagan State Forest. The VMB2 Channel 3 Repeater is used by a regular crew of radio operators but also by users that are on holidays or people who have UHF CB in their vehicle.

VMB2 is located on a hill on the North end of the Central Coast and has a good coverage area.

The Morse ID plays every 10 minutes which is the repeaters callsign (VMB2).

Other Nearby Repeaters
 MDC08 - Kariong (Currently Offline)
 CHT01 - AAMI Building Charlestown (Former AMP Building)
 CHT05 - AAMI Building Charlestown (Former AMP Building)
 NEW06 - General Communications Radio Tower Sugarloaf Range

Radio stations in Sydney
Citizens band radio in Australia